Coopers Mills is an unincorporated village in the town of Whitefield, Lincoln County, Maine, United States. Coopers Mills has a post office with ZIP code 04341.

References

Villages in Lincoln County, Maine
Villages in Maine